Megan Mary Wraight (12 December 1961 – 31 August 2020) was a New Zealand landscape architect who had considerable influence on the design of public spaces. She was the founding principal of Wraight + Associates Limited, which has completed a wide variety of large-scale urban projects throughout New Zealand, including waterfront redevelopments, educational facilities, transport facilities and urban-renewal projects.

Biography 

Wraight was born in Rangiora and lived in rural settings there, Havelock North and Motueka as she was growing up.

Wraight completed a Bachelor of Landscape Architecture at RMIT University, Melbourne, in 1992.  In 2006, she received the International Federation of Landscape Architect award, one of the industry's highest international honours, and in 2013 she was the first landscape architect to receive the Arts Foundation of New Zealand Laureate Award.

Her Waitangi Park project in Wellington showcased sustainable landscape design, particularly water conservation, and her work on the Wynyard Quarter on Auckland's waterfront is an example of urban waterfront renewal. Wraight + Associates also designed Pukeahu National War Memorial Park in Wellington, and have won many awards from the New Zealand Institute of Landscape Architects, including four of the top awards in 2017.

Projects and awards 
Some of Wraight + Associates' projects include:

 The development of Waitangi Park, Taranaki Wharf, CentrePort and the Lambton Harbour Masterplan on Wellington's Waterfront
 The Hood Street Upgrade, Hamilton
 Waitomo Caves Visitors' Centre, with Architecture Workshop
 Christchurch Coastal Pathway
 Wynyard Quarter, Jellicoe Street, North Wharf and Silo Park on Auckland's waterfront
 Pukeahu National War Memorial Park in Wellington, as Wraight Athfield Landscape + Architecture Ltd (WALA) (Category Winner, Parks category, NZILA awards 2017)
Victoria University of Wellington Hub - Wraight + Associates Ltd with Athfield | Architectus (NZILA Award of Excellence, Institutional category, 2017) 
Cenotaph Precinct Upgrade, Wraight + Associates Ltd & Wellington City Council Urban Design Team (Category Winner, Urban spaces category, NZILA awards 2017)

References

External links 
 

1961 births
2020 deaths
New Zealand landscape architects
RMIT University alumni